Most visitors to Mauritius are visa exempt or can obtain a visa on arrival. However, some countries must obtain a visa in advance before being allowed into the country.

Under Mauritian law, all visitors are required to hold proof of sufficient funds to cover their stay (minimum of US$100 per day), confirmed hotel reservation and documents required for their next destination. Business visits may not exceed 120 days within one calendar year and a maximum stay of 180 days in total (tourism and business) is granted within one calendar year.

Visa policy map

Visa exemption 

Holders of passports issued by the following 114 countries or territories may stay without a visa for 90 days:

In addition, a visa-free stay of 90 days will be granted to:
Holders of diplomatic passports issued to nationals of any country if not already exempt, except for Afghanistan, Iran, Iraq, Libya, Somalia, South Sudan, Sudan and Yemen;
Holders of a Laissez-Passer issued by the United Nations or any other internationally recognized organisation;
Holders of an Interpol passport when traveling on duty.

Spouses and children under 14 of nationals and residents of Mauritius do not need a visa.

Visa on arrival 
Visitors from any country or territory that are neither visa exempt nor included in the next chapter can obtain a visa on arrival for a maximum stay of 60 days. However, the following passport holders are entitled to a visa on arrival valid for 2 weeks:

Visa required 
Citizens of the following 16 countries and territories must obtain a visa in advance from one of the Mauritian diplomatic missions:

Transit without a visa 
Holders of confirmed onward tickets may transit through Mauritius without a visa for a maximum time of 24 hours. This is not applicable to nationals of the following countries:

Passengers in transit must hold a travel document accepted for entry into Mauritius.

Merchant seamen in transit do not require a visa regardless of nationality or type of transport if the government is informed by the shipping company.

Mauritius Premium Travel Visa 

In October 2020, Government of Mauritius launched the Premium Travel visa as a response to the impacts of COVID-19 on the Mauritian tourist trade. The visa is open to anyone who can show they have the financial resources to support themselves to live in Mauritius. The visa does not allow holders to accept a job in the Mauritian economy.

Statistics 

Most visitors arriving to Mauritius were from the following countries or territories of residence:

See also 

 Visa requirements for Mauritian citizens
 List of diplomatic missions of Mauritius

References 

Mauritius
Foreign relations of Mauritius